The Christian Allemong House (also known as the Amos Janney House) is located near Summit Point, West Virginia.

Description and history 
The house was built around 1830 in the Georgian style with Greek Revival detailing. The house was owned by Amos Janney from 1848 to 1868. During the American Civil War, it is believed that Union soldiers wintered in the area to the north of the house, digging four wells, of which one survives. A local belief describes the nearby community of Jamestown as the former slave quarters of the Allemong property. The house is located on property that is now part of Summit Point Motorsports Park.  Some renovation appears to have been done, for example, central air conditioning units are visible outside the house.

References

American Civil War sites in West Virginia
Georgian architecture in West Virginia
Greek Revival houses in West Virginia
Houses completed in 1830
Houses in Jefferson County, West Virginia
Houses on the National Register of Historic Places in West Virginia
Jefferson County, West Virginia in the American Civil War
National Register of Historic Places in Jefferson County, West Virginia
Plantation houses in West Virginia
1830 establishments in Virginia